Miguel López is an Argentine film editor.

Some of the films he has edited have been critically well received, for example: La Noche de los lápices (1986).

Filmography
 Destino de un capricho (1972)
 Los Hombres sólo piensan en eso (1976)
 Sálvese quien pueda (1984)
 Los Reyes del sablazo (1984)
 Pasajeros de una pesadilla (1984)  Nightmare's Passengers
 Mirame la palomita (1985)
 La Noche de los lápices (1986) a.k.a. Night of the Pencils
 Rambito y Rambón primera misión (1986)
 Sobredosis (1986)
 Los Colimbas se divierten (1986)
 Galería del terror (1987)
 Los Colimbas al ataque (1987)
 El Profesor Punk (1988)
 Atracción peculiar (1988)
 Delito de corrupción (1991)
 Siempre es difícil volver a casa (1992) a.k.a. It's Always Hard to Return Home
 Adiós, abuelo (1996)

References

External links
 

1945 births
Argentine film editors
Living people
Place of birth missing (living people)